Cnaphalocrocis grucheti is a moth in the family Crambidae. It was described by Viette in 1976. It is found on La Réunion.

References

Moths described in 1976
Spilomelinae